Sweetser may refer to:

 Charles H. Sweetser (1841–1871), author and journalist
 Charles Sweetser (1808–1864), politician
 Eve Sweetser, linguist
 Frank L. Sweetser (1874–1953), American pioneer management consultant
 James R. Sweetser, elected prosecutor and trial attorney 
 Jess Sweetser (1902–1989), amateur golfer
 Kate Dickinson Sweetser (?-1939), fiction author
 Lewis H. Sweetser, politician
 Wesley D. Sweetser (1919–2006), critic

See also

 Sweetser, Indiana
 Sweetser's Apple Barrel & Orchards
 Sweetzer
 Switzer (disambiguation)